Paramysidia is a genus of derbid planthoppers in the family Derbidae. There are about seven described species in Paramysidia.

Species
These seven species belong to the genus Paramysidia:
 Paramysidia barbara Broomfield, 1985 c g
 Paramysidia boudica Broomfield, 1985 c g
 Paramysidia felix Broomfield, 1985 c g
 Paramysidia mississippiensis (Dozier, 1922) c g b
 Paramysidia nigropunctata (Metcalf, 1938) c g
 Paramysidia tessellata Broomfield, 1985 c g
 Paramysidia vulgaris Broomfield, 1985 c g
Data sources: i = ITIS, c = Catalogue of Life, g = GBIF, b = Bugguide.net

References

Further reading

External links

 

Auchenorrhyncha genera
Derbinae